Citizens' Service Centers  (Greek:Κέντρο Εξυπηρέτησης Πολιτών, ΚΕΠ) are state stores established by article 31 of law 3013/2002 (Government Gazette 102 / A), initially in the Prefectures' Headquarters, in order to reduce bureaucracy and faster service to citizens in terms of their transactions with the state. The role of CSC is to be the contact points of the Public Services with the citizens and to provide one-stop services.

Predecessor of CSC were the Citizens' Offices (Γραφεία του Πολίτη).

Some of the 2,000 services provided are the following:

Certificate of authenticity of the signature, made in the personal presence of the citizen carrying with them an identification document (identity card, passport, driver's license or Medical booklet) 
Certificate of exact copy for public or private documents that have been certified by a lawyer (valid only in the case of documents intended for use in companies or private organizations as public documents do not need certification for use in the public sector, according to law 4250/2014) 
Physical identification of the citizen and the civil servant for the issuance of personal digital authentication signature and encryption certificates

References

Government of Greece
Law of Greece